Mir Afsar Ali or Mir is an Indian radio jockey, television anchor, singer, comedian, actor and media personality. He was the host of Mirakkel, a Comedy show on Zee Bangla and Hi Kolkata on Radio Mirchi. He gives voice over on a show in which suspenseful stories are read named Sunday Suspense on Radio Mirchi. He is also the producer and presenter of a popular Bengali food vlogging channel "Foodka" since 2017.

He left Radio Mirchi on 1 July 2022. 27 years of relationship with radio.

Television
 Mirakkel
 Jabab Kinte Chai
 The Kapil Sharma Show appeared for promotion of the film Colkatay Columbus

Filmography
Binodini: Ekti Natir Upakhyan (2023)
Bijoyar Pore (2023)
Michael (2018)
Aschhe Abar Shabor (2018)
 Satyadar Coaching (2017)
 Dhananjay (2017)
 Dekh Kemon Lage (2017)
 Byomkesh Pawrbo (2016)
 Colkatay Columbus (2016)
 Aranyadeb(2016)
 Sesh Anka (2015)
 Obhishopto Nighty (2014)
 Ashchorjyo Prodeep (2013)
 Bhooter Bhabishyat (2012)
 Chaplin (2011)
 Notobor Notout (2010)
 The Bong Connection (2006)

Dubbed voice

Ali gives voices in Bengali, Telugu, Tamil, Kannada, Malayalam languages.

Awards 
 Kalakar Awards

References

External links
 
  Interview: My Fundays
 Interview: Laughing Matter
 Interview: Risque behaviour

Indian television presenters
Living people
University of Calcutta alumni
Kalakar Awards winners
Indian stand-up comedians
Indian male comedians
People from Murshidabad district
Bengali male actors
Year of birth missing (living people)